The 2017–18 Melbourne Renegades Women's season was the third in the team's history. Coached by Tim Coyle, they finished the regular season of WBBL03 in sixth place. Captain and new recruit Amy Satterthwaite won the league-wide Player of the Tournament award, though the Renegades nevertheless once again failed to qualify for finals. In promising signs for the team's future, all-rounder Sophie Molineux won the WBBL Young Gun Award, for which leg spinner Georgia Wareham and pace bowler Maitlan Brown were also nominated.

Squad
Each WBBL|03 squad featured 15 active players, with an allowance of up to five marquee signings including a maximum of three from overseas. Australian marquees are classed as players who made at least ten limited-overs appearances for the national team in the three years prior to the cut-off date (24 April 2017).

Personnel changes ahead of the season included:

 Tim Coyle was appointed head coach, replacing Lachlan Stevens.
 New Zealand marquee Amy Satterthwaite signed on, having departed the Hobart Hurricanes. Satterthwaite was appointed captain, replacing Rachel Priest (6–10 win–loss record) who moved to the Sydney Thunder.
 England marquee Danni Wyatt did not return for WBBL|03. Sri Lanka marquee Chamari Atapattu filled the vacant overseas player slot.
 Grace Harris departed after one season, returning to the Brisbane Heat.
 Annabel Sutherland moved to the Melbourne Stars.
 Jess Duffin, Emma Inglis and Hayley Jensen signed with the Renegades, exiting the Melbourne Stars. Jensen, a New Zealander, was classed as a local player due to her permanent residence in Australia and a lack of recent international cricket appearances.
 Claire Koski joined the team, following her departure from the Sydney Thunder.

The table below lists the Renegades players and their key stats (including runs scored, batting strike rate, wickets taken, economy rate, catches and stumpings) for the season.

Ladder

Fixtures

Regular season

With the Renegades requiring 28 runs from the remaining 17 balls, new recruit Jess Duffin was dismissed in controversial fashion by what commentators and players believed to be an illegitimate catch. The momentum of the contest then swung dramatically and the Renegades lost by eleven runs.

In "bizarre" scenes, Sixers batter Sarah Aley attempted to score a game-tying run on the last delivery despite Renegades wicket-keeper Emma Inglis, having received the ball over the stumps from fielder Kris Britt and thus believing the match to be over, already celebrating victory. After deliberation, officiating umpires deemed the ball was not dead and the run would be allowed, thereby forcing a super over which the Renegades nevertheless went on to win.

Chasing 119 for victory, Renegades captain Amy Satterthwaite—who looked to have been run out earlier in the innings and left the field, but was recalled after TV replays showed wicket-keeper Nicole Faltum had dislodged the bails prematurely—hit a six off the final delivery against the bowling of Georgia Elwiss to tie the game. With scores still level after the super over, the Stars were awarded the win on the boundary count back rule.

Statistics and awards

 Most runs: Amy Satterthwaite – 368 (8th in the league)
 Highest score in an innings: Jess Duffin – 81 (47) vs Sydney Thunder, 9 December 2017
 Most wickets: Lea Tahuhu – 17 (equal 4th in the league)
 Best bowling figures in an innings: Hayley Jensen – 3/11 (3 overs) vs Sydney Thunder, 24 January 2018
 Most catches (fielder): Sophie Molineux – 9 (equal 3rd in the league)
 Player of the Match awards:
 Sophie Molineux, Amy Satterthwaite – 3 each
 Jess Duffin – 1
 Renegades Player of the Season: Amy Satterthwaite
 WBBL|03 Player of the Tournament: Amy Satterthwaite (1st)
 WBBL|03 Team of the Tournament: Amy Satterthwaite, Lea Tahuhu
 WBBL|03 Young Gun Award: Sophie Molineux (winner), Georgia Wareham (nominated), Maitlan Brown (nominated)

References

2017–18 Women's Big Bash League season by team
Melbourne Renegades (WBBL)